Fred Wilkinson (8 June 1906 – September 1978) was a British motorcycle speedway rider who rode in the early years of the sport, including riding for England against Australia in 1931.

Biography
Wilkinson was born in Coalville, Leicestershire in 1906, his father a miner at a local colliery. The family moved to Binley near Coventry, and then Seend in Wiltshire, with Wilkinson starting his racing career in grasstrack races. His early speedway experience was at the Gorse Hill Autodrome in Swindon, and at Bristol. In 1929 he signed for the Leicester Super team, also riding for Coventry, settling in Syston, Leicestershire, where he ran a garage. He captained the Super team in 1930, and stayed with the team until it closed in 1931. 

Wilkinson rode for England in the second Test match of 1931 against Australia, staged at Leicester Super Speedway, scoring three points. He was selected at reserve for the fourth test at Belle Vue but did not score from his one ride.

Wilkinson moved on to ride for Belle Vue in 1932.

He was commemorated by an event in the 1980s that bore his name: The Fred Wilkinson Trophy match was staged at Leicester Stadium between 1980 and 1983, with a further staging at Peterborough in 1985.

References

1906 births
1978 deaths
British speedway riders
English motorcycle racers
Leicester Super riders
Coventry Bees riders
Belle Vue Aces riders
People from Coalville
People from Syston
Sportspeople from Leicestershire